This is a list of Wikipedia articles about brand names under which electric guitars have been sold.

A
  Alembic
  Tom Anderson
  Aria

C
  Caparison
  Carvin
  Chapman
  Charvel
  Cort

D
  Danelectro
  D'Angelico
  Dean
  Duesenberg

E
  Eko
  Epiphone
  ESP

F
  Fender
  Fender Japan
  Fernandes
  First Act
  Framus

G
  G&L
  Gibson
  Godin
  Greco
  Gretsch

H
  Hallmark
  Harmony
  Heritage
  Höfner
  Hagström

I
  Ibanez

J
  Jackson

K
  Kay
  Kiesel Custom Guitars
  Kramer

M
  Mayones
  Mosrite
  Might Be Famous

P
  Parker
  PRS

R
  B.C. Rich
  Rickenbacker
  Relish
  Reverend Guitars

S
  Samick
  Schecter
  Shergold
  Silvertone
  Steinberger
  Suhr
  Switch Music

T
  Tagima
  TEISCO
  Tokai
  James Tyler

U
  Univox

V
  Valco
  Vester
  Vigier Guitars
  VOX

W
  Warwick
  Washburn
  Westbury

Y
  Yamaha

Z
  Zemaitis

References

Guitar
 
 
List-Class guitarist articles